For Gordon Bunshaft is a 2006 sculpture by Dan Graham, installed at the Hirshhorn Museum and Sculpture Garden in Washington, D.C., United States. The work, which refers to American architect Gordon Bunshaft, was installed by the reflection pool of the Bunshaft-designed sculpture garden at the Hirshhorn on May 30, 2008.

See also
 2006 in art
 List of public art in Washington, D.C., Ward 2

References

External links

 Virtual tour, Hirshhorn Museum and Sculpture Garden

2006 sculptures
Hirshhorn Museum and Sculpture Garden
Outdoor sculptures in Washington, D.C.
Sculptures of the Smithsonian Institution